Val-d'Arc (literally Vale of Arc) is a commune in the Savoie department in the Auvergne-Rhône-Alpes region in south-eastern France. It was established on 1 January 2019 by merger of the former communes of Randens (the seat) and Aiguebelle.

See also
Communes of the Savoie department

References

Communes of Savoie
Graioceli